Avenger Penguins is a British animated series produced by Cosgrove Hall Films and Granada Television in 1993, and animated by both Alfonso Productions, a Spanish-based animation studio also responsible for bringing Cosgrove Hall's shows Count Duckula, Victor and Hugo: Bunglers in Crime, Fantomcat, Sooty's Amazing Adventures and The Foxbusters to life, and in-house by Cosgrove Hall themselves. It aired originally on Children's ITV and was originally going to be called Hell's Penguins, although was it renamed out of concern for how the religious audience in the US would respond. 26 episodes aired from 1993 to 1994.

The show has the distinction of being the last Cosgrove Hall cartoon to be animated using hand-painted animation cels, as all 2D animated series from the studio thereafter would use computers for the ink and paint process; with the animation, drawings scanned and then digitally colored. This was the first major Cosgrove Hall carton without the aid of Thames Television who had lost their ITV franchise at the end of 1992. The show was instead distributed on the ITV network by Cosgrove Hall's local regional TV company Granada instead.

The entire series was released on a three-disc DVD box set in March 2006 by Delta Leisure Group PLC.

Influences
As with most Cosgrove Hall cartoons, the series poked fun at the popular concepts of having creatures performing inhuman action feats and stunts in an animated medium, made popular by the then enormously successful Teenage Mutant Ninja Turtles franchise. The core of the show's theme is coincidentally similar to Biker Mice from Mars.

Details
The story revolves around three bike-riding Penguins that inhabit Big City, uniting to protect it and its citizens from the evil Caractacus P. Doom, an insane and reclusive criminal scientist. The Penguins attempt to prevent Doom's schemes but find themselves often hampered by their own miscommunicating and occasional scraps with other biker gangs infesting Big City, such as The Stink Brothers, a canine squad of Hell's Angels.

The cast, like Danger Mouse, Count Duckula and Victor and Hugo: Bunglers in Crime had with David Jason, boasted a star talent in a major role, this time in the form of American comedian Mike McShane as the Penguin's un-coordinated but brash leader Marlon, as well as the villainous Doom. To show how the series was mocking the often rushed animation style of the original TMNT series, two supporting characters are known as "The Badly Drawn Brothers" were always left with the design construction lines still showing out of deliberate neglect.

Pop culture references were found in abundance in many of the episodes and in the characters. Doom himself is patterned on an elderly Orson Welles, Harry Slime (who talks like Peter Lorre) in the meantime is based somewhat on Harry Lime, a character from the movie The Third Man. The Season 2 episode, "The 23rd Century" also served as a parody of Star Trek, and of science fiction in general.

Voice cast

Marlon: Mike McShane
Rocky: Rob Rackstraw
Bluey: Jimmy Hibbert
Bella: Jimmy Hibbert
Caractacus P. Doom: Mike McShane
Harry Slime: Jimmy Hibbert
Various other characters: Mike McShane, Rob Rackstraw, Jimmy Hibbert and Lorelei King.
Theme song vocalist: Paul Young

Episodes

Series 1 (1993–1994)

Series 2 (1994)

DVD and VHS releases

DVD releases
The entire series was released on a three-disc DVD box set in March 2006 by Delta Entertainment.

Complete set

Individual episodes

VHS releases
During the show's original run, Avenger Penguins episodes were released on 3 VHS titles from Thames Video and Arena Home Entertainment, often in a different sequence than that when televised.

In Australia, there were six videos from Reel Entertainment releasing all the episodes of series 1 and one episode of series 2. Each of them contained 2 episodes.

International broadcasts
  Chile
 Megavision (1994–1996)
 Canal 13 (1995–2001)
 UCV Television (1997–1998)
  Australia
 ABC (1995–1997)
 7Two (2009–2011)
 Network 10
  Sweden
 TV4
  Ireland
 TV3 (1998–2000)
  South Africa
 SABC2
  Singapore
 Channel 5 (1995–1996)
  Southeast Asia
 Disney Channel (2001–2002)
  United Arab Emirates
 Dubai 33
  New Zealand
 TV2 (1995–1996)
  Malaysia
 TV1 (1996–1999)
  Israel
 Arutz HaYeladim
  Poland
 TVP Regionalna
  Japan
 Nickelodeon
  Germany
 BFBS
 SSVC Television
  Iceland
 BBC Prime (1995–1996)
  Hong Kong
 TVB Pearl (1995)
  Thailand
 IBC7
  Zimbabwe
 ZBC TV
  Kenya
 KBC

See also
 List of animal superheroes
 Biker Mice from Mars

References

External links
Toonhound's entry on Avenger Penguins

1993 British television series debuts
1994 British television series endings
1990s British animated television series
1990s British children's television series
British children's animated adventure television series
English-language television shows
ITV children's television shows
Television series by Fremantle (company)
Television series by FremantleMedia Kids & Family
Television shows produced by Granada Television
Television series by Cosgrove Hall Films
Animated television series about penguins